The 2011 European Senior Tour was the 20th season of the European Senior Tour, the professional golf tour for men aged 50 and above operated by the PGA European Tour. Peter Fowler won two events and the Order of Merit title.

Tournament results
The season started with three events in late 2010. The numbers in brackets after the winners' names show the number of career wins they had on the European Senior Tour up to and including that event. This is only shown for players who are members of the tour.

For the tour schedule on the European Senior Tour's website, including links to full results, click here.

Leading money winners

There is a complete list on the official site here.

External links

European Seniors Tour
European Senior Tour